Alfonso de la Peña y Montenegro (29 Apr 1596 – 1687) was a Spanish Roman Catholic prelate who served as Bishop of Quito (1653–1687).

Biography
Alfonso de la Peña Montenegro  was born in Padrón, in the Kingdom of Galicia, Castile, on 29 April 1596. On 4 March 1653, he was selected by the King of Spain and confirmed by Pope Innocent X on 18 August 1653 as Bishop of Quito. In April 1654, he was consecrated bishop by Cristóbal de Torres, Archbishop of Santafé en Nueva Granada. He served as Bishop of Quito until his death in 1687.

References

External links and additional sources
 (for Chronology of Bishops) 
 (for Chronology of Bishops) 

1596 births
1687 deaths
People from the Province of A Coruña
17th-century Roman Catholic bishops in Ecuador
Bishops appointed by Pope Innocent X
Spanish Roman Catholic bishops in South America
Roman Catholic missionaries in Ecuador
Roman Catholic bishops of Quito